Koparan can refer to:

 Koparan, Gölbaşı
 Koparan, Güney